Trengellick Rising is an upcoming Cornish language short film written and directed by Guy Potter. The film was successfully funded via Kickstarter and has received support from Cornwall Council, Falmouth University and the Sound/Image Cinema Lab.

Cast 

 Guy Potter as Private Gerren Pascoe
 Jeremy Manning as Jago Helghyer
 Zennor Rose as Persephone Cadieux
 Micheal Fenner as The Constable
 Gwilym Evans as Jeffra
 Bryn Evans as Branok
 Kamil Simpson as Kensa
 Arthur Southwick as Peran
 Edie Moles as The Messenger

Production

Development 
Development of the film began in late 2019, with Guy Potter writing the script as a follow up to his micro-short Prey, a film created on assignment for Sundance Collab. Intending to expand on the format of Prey, it was decided that Trengellick Rising should also be shot on Black & White 16mm film, and hand-processed in much the same way. This became an integral part of the Trengellick Rising production, which was then placed on-hold due to the COVID-19 pandemic.

In March 2021 it was decided that the film be performed entirely in Kernewek, or the Cornish language. The script was translated by Cornwall Council and the Trengellick Rising fundraising page was launched on Kickstarter.

On the 1 April 2021, Trengellick Rising was successfully financed through Kickstarter, achieving 145% of its target. The project raised £6,550 from 103 different pledges from all over the world.

Filming 
Filming was set to begin in April 2021 in locations around Bodmin (including Jamaica Inn, Rough Tor, and Colliford Lake) as well as near Welcombe and Hartland in Devon. Filming on the project wrapped a few weeks later.

Processing and developing 

In October 2021, Potter began to develop the footage by hand, in a makeshift darkroom at home. Mixing the chemicals and processing the film himself, he developed over 3,500 ft, over a kilometre of film negative. In an interview with BBC Cornwall, he described this as “the hardest part of the production so far” but that the resulting aesthetic was “scratchy, raw and rough around the edges, much like the story itself.”

References

External links 
 
 Official Website: https://www.trengellickrising.com
 Twitter Page: https://www.twitter.com/trengellickfilm
 Instagram Page: https://www.instagram.com/trengellickrisingfilm



Upcoming films
Cornish language
British drama short films
British independent films
British historical drama films
Films set in the 18th century
Films set in Cornwall
Films shot in 16 mm film